Chérif Oudjani (born 9 December 1964) is a former professional footballer who played as a striker, spending his career in France. Born in France, he played for the Algeria national team internationally, most notably winning the 1990 African Cup of Nations. He is the son of footballer Ahmed Oudjani.

External links
 
 RC Lens profile
 Stade Lavallois profile

1964 births
Living people
People from Lens, Pas-de-Calais
French people of Kabyle descent
French sportspeople of Algerian descent
Kabyle people
Sportspeople from Pas-de-Calais
Footballers from Hauts-de-France
French footballers
Algerian footballers
Association football forwards
Algeria international footballers
Africa Cup of Nations-winning players
1990 African Cup of Nations players
Ligue 1 players
RC Lens players
Stade Lavallois players
FC Sochaux-Montbéliard players
AS Beauvais Oise players
OFC Charleville players
SAS Épinal players
Gazélec Ajaccio players
Wasquehal Football players
Valenciennes FC players
Pacy Ménilles RC players